Muqur (other names: Qala-i-Sarkari, Mukar, Qala-i-Sarkāri, Moqur, Mukur, Moqur, Moqor) is located in the southern part of Muqur District, Ghazni, Afghanistan.

See also
 Muqur (disambiguation)
 Ghazni Province

Populated places in Ghazni Province